Under the Skin of the City (Zir-e poost-e shahr), also released as Under the City's Skin, is a 2001 Iranian drama film directed by Rakhshan Bani-E'temad. It was entered into the 23rd Moscow International Film Festival where it won the Special Golden St. George.

Adapted from this movie, another short film called "Zir Posht Shahr Tehran" directed by Abolfazl Amiri was made in 2022 Iranian Date 1400 2.

Plot
Tooba, a working-class woman, who lives a poor life, likes to live in the same house as her husband Mahmoud and her eldest son Abbas. His younger son, Ali, who teaches his mother literacy, in the midst of the sixth House of Representatives elections, he is interested in his country's political issues and is involved in campaigning and from time to time his foot is dragged to the police station.

Abbas, who dreams of traveling to Japan and works in a cloths workshop, closes her heart to the love of a girl, the older daughter of the family who is pregnant, returns to her mother's house after being beaten by her husband with her little girl, but later she returns to her home through Tooba.  Abbas and his father, in tooba's absence, give the deed’s house to the "architect" who is the buyer of the house. While Maryam, Tooba's neighbor and colleague at the factory, is preparing to celebrate her eldest daughter Somaya's wedding, her little girl, Masoumeh, run from home because she was beating by her brother after being late. Mahboubeh, Tooba's little girl who is friend with Masoumeh, visits her in Mellat Park, but she is arrested by the police and taken to the police station.

Webby, who wants to pawn the deed’house for her daughter's release at the police station, realizes that the deed is not at home. They bring the girl home. The visa office is fake and Abbas comes to being involved with the drugs trafficking. He goes to Orumieh, where Ali, suspected of his sudden decision, secretly rides in the back of his pickup truck and discovers that he is going to deliver the clothes among which the drugs are embedded.

Ali spills out the clothes, and Abbas beats him severely after finding his brother in the back of the van, but then they come back together. Tooba goes to his hideout to visit Abbas. Abbas' boss follows him, but he runs away with his mother's help. In the end, Tooba speaks in front of the TV camera on Election Day, telling them that it is better to shoot a video from inside of her heart.

Cast
 Golab Adineh as Tooba
 Mohammad Reza Forutan as Abbas
 Baran Kosari as Mahboubeh
 Ebrahin Sheibani as Ali
 Mohsen Ghazi Moradi as Mahmoud the Father
 Mehraveh Sharifinia as Masoumeh
 Homeira Riazi as Hamideh
 Alireza Oosivand as Nasser Khan
 Mehrdad Falahatger as Marandi
 Nazanin Farahani as Nahid

References

External links
 
 

2001 films
2001 drama films
Persian-language films
Iranian drama films